Her Choice may refer to:
 Her Choice (1915 film), an American silent comedy film
 Her Choice (1912 film), an American silent film